Dave is a British free-to-air television channel owned by UKTV, a subsidiary of BBC Studios. It broadcasts mainly comedy, with some factual programming. The channel took the name Dave on 15 October 2007, but it had been on air under various identities and formats since October 1998.

History

UK Gold Classics and UK Gold 2 (1998–2003)
UK Gold Classics, UKTV's first digital-only channel, was launched on 2 October 1998 and was only broadcast from Friday to Sunday on Sky Digital from 6.00 pm to 2.00 am. Around this time, UK Gold began to move towards newer programmes instead of older ones; the 'classics' line-up included a number of early shows, including some black-and-white programmes, which had been acquired in the early years of the UK Gold service. They also showed some recent shows from the main channel, but the main purpose of the channel was older shows from the early years of UK Gold. On weekdays, the channel was off air, showing a still caption of all the UKTV channels and start-up times.

The 'Classics' format lasted just six months; the channel ended on 28 March 1999, and from 2 April 1999, the channel was renamed to UK Gold 2, and screened morning programmes from UK Gold time-shifted to the evening of the same day instead of classic shows.

UK G² and UKTV G2 (2003–2007)
The channel was relaunched with a completely new programme line-up and renamed UK G² on 12 November 2003. It was promoted as being an edgier alternative to UK Gold; like that channel, the output was mainly comedy series from the BBC with some shows produced in-house. A fair amount was similar to the comedy output of UK Play/Play UK before that channel's closure; however, unlike Play, the channel did not include music videos.

Along with the rest of the UKTV network, the "UK" prefix was changed to "UKTV" on 8 March 2004 and therefore, the channel name changed to UKTV G2.

Initially, the channel broadcast in the evenings only, but during the 'G2' era, the decision was made to expand hours into the daytime; to expand the programming line-up, comedy was joined by popular-factual and magazine shows which were already running on UKTV People (then Blighty, now Drama) such as Top Gear and Airport.

G2 programming
On 7 October 2005, it was announced that they would show sports programming. This new line-up was called UKTV Sport and included a new show by the same name. UKTV Sport also had its own logo and DOG. There was talk that this could lead to a channel but it never happened.

In February 2006, they obtained the rights to show highlights of the RBS Six Nations rugby union championship, with a highlights show broadcast on the evening of the games previously shown live on the BBC. On 16 March 2006, they announced a deal to air extensive coverage of the 2006 FIFA World Cup as a sub-licensing of the BBC's rights to the tournament. UKTV G2 simulcast the BBC's live matches, including the opening match between Germany and Costa Rica, England's game with Paraguay and the final. The channel also showed highlights of every match in the tournament.

In April 2006, the channel acquired the rights to the quarter-finals of Euroleague Basketball and in August, UKTV G2 also picked up rights to the 2006 FIBA World Championship, forming the programme 'UKTV Slam'.

Dave and Freeview launch (2007–present)

In September 2007, UKTV announced that they would relaunch and rename UKTV G2 as Dave on 15 October. UKTV said the name of the channel was chosen because "everyone knows a bloke called Dave". The concept and branding was the work of Red Bee Media. The rebrand included the channel being available free-to-air on digital terrestrial platform, Freeview, replacing UKTV Bright Ideas which only averaged 0.1% of the audience share. The move to Freeview saw Dave launch in the bandwidth previously used by UKTV History which was moved to the time limited (7.00 am to 6.00 pm) bandwidth once occupied by UKTV Bright Ideas. Dave is available daily, from 7.00 am to 4.00 am, on all platforms. It uses the tagline "the home of witty banter" and uses Ralph Ineson as an announcer, along with David Flynn, Phill Jupitus, Iain Lee and BBC Radio 1 DJ Greg James.

To ensure that all Freeview viewers received Dave on channel number 19, UKTV briefly placed a re-tuning notice on the programme's information. In September 2012, it changed to channel number 12.

From 31 January 2008, the channel began broadcasting in widescreen, along with the other UKTV channels.

In April 2009, they aired three new instalments of Red Dwarf, entitled Back to Earth. This marked the channel's first foray into scripted original programming. During the airing of the Red Dwarf mini-series, the Dave DOG in the top left corner of the screen had the word 'Lister' added after it in the same font, after the show's lead character; during the special it is even suggested that the station is named after him. Back to Earth brought record breaking viewing figures, not just in the context of the channel's past, but for digital television in general. Subsequently, three full series of Red Dwarf have been produced for Dave which aired in 2012, 2016 and 2017, along with a feature-length special in 2020.

In June 2009, the logo was updated to incorporate the 'circle' logo branding of all the new UKTV channels (for example Home, G.O.L.D., Really). At the same time, the voice of Dave became Nigel Grover, aka Scott Saunders, who had previously worked at a number of local radio stations. On 29 April 2014, the 'circle' logo was removed and the original 2007 logo was restored.

In June 2019, Dave moved to channel 19 on Freeview, a space previously occupied by Yesterday, due to its owner BBC Studios (which currently assumes full control of UKTV), breaking up its joint venture with Discovery, Inc., with Discovery acquiring Good Food, Home and Really from the network.

On 9 November 2022, the logo was once again modified to include a tilted rectangle/box behind it. With the logo alteration came a rebrand for the channel, including new presentation and new idents. A new slogan asks viewers to "Add a bit of Dave" to their lives.

Subsidiary channels

Dave ja vu 

Alongside the main channel, a timeshift channel is also operated: Dave Ja Vu. Corresponding to the name on the main channel, it shows all programming from the channel one hour later. The channel originally launched on 1 November 2004 as UKTV G2 +1 on Sky and Telewest.

As UKTV G2 at the time was a primetime service, the timeshift also operated in the evenings only, using the satellite and cable capacity which, during daytime, was used by the now-defunct UKTV Bright Ideas. The sharing arrangement meant that when UKTV G2's hours extended into daytime, the timeshift remained evenings-only.

At the time of the Dave relaunch, UKTV Bright Ideas closed, freeing up the space to allow UKTV G2 +1 to expand its hours to follow those of the parent channel fully; due to the main channel's relaunch as Dave, UKTV G2 +1 became Dave +1. From 22 January 2009, following UKTV's acquisition of a further Freeview broadcast slot, Dave +1 was made available on the digital terrestrial platform.

On 24 February 2009, Dave +1 was renamed Dave ja vu (a play on the phrase déjà vu) on all platforms; this was carried out to "strengthen the brand's positioning as the home of witty banter" according to UKTV bosses.

On 14 June 2011, UKTV announced that Really would launch on Freeview on 2 August 2011, to facilitate this Dave ja vu's broadcast hours on the platform were reduced from 8.00 am-4.00 am to 2.00 am-4.00 am. On 22 November 2012, UKTV confirmed that it had secured a deal for another 24-hour DTT slot and would use it for Dave ja vu until it firmed up permanent plans for the slot. Dave ja vu began to broadcast its full schedule on the platform again from 3 January 2013. Drama permanently took the slot from 8 July 2013, however Dave ja vu continued to broadcast between 2.00 am-5.00 am.

On 20 November 2014, Dave ja vu returned to 24-hour broadcasting.

After UKTV bought CCXTV, they swapped the channel numbers around on Freeview, so Dave ja vu ended up on channel 23, whilst CCXTV ended up on Freeview 73.
After the relaunch of BBC Three (and with BBC Four in Scotland taking the next slot) Dave ja vu moved down to channel 25, until March 2022, when UKTV revealed that it would be going back to the 70s section on the Freeview EPG as the channel number was used by UKTV for their female skewing W channel. From 28 March 2022, Dave Ja Vu took Drama+1's slot on Freeview 74, with that one-hour timeshift of Drama moving up to channel 60.

Dave HD
On 29 July 2011, UKTV announced that it had secured a deal with BSkyB to launch three more high-definition channels on Sky. As part of Virgin Media's deal to sell its share of UKTV, all five of UKTV's HD channels would also be added to Virgin's cable television service by 2012. Dave HD launched on 10 October 2011 on Sky and Virgin Media, two days before Watch HD, while Alibi HD launched in July 2012. All three channels are HD simulcasts of the standard-definition channel. Dave HD along with Good Food HD and Eden HD launched on BT TV on 3 October 2016.

Reception
Within just one month of its launch, Dave had become the tenth largest television channel in the UK. The broadcaster puts daily averages at around 3 million viewers, although, much of the growth may be attributed to its presence on Freeview; nonetheless, it is performing significantly better in pay TV homes than UKTV G2 ever did. Over the month since its launch, Dave averaged a 1.32% share in multichannel homes and a 3.2% share in the 16–34 male demographic.

Dave's positive reception is proven by an attraction of 4 million viewers throughout 18 November 2007 for its coverage of "Car of the Year", pushing it to second place in multichannel behind ITV2.

The first episode of Red Dwarf: Back to Earth attracted 2,060,000 viewers on the first viewing, though over 4 million viewed the episode at some point over its debut weekend. The highest rating original commission before this had been Red Bull X-Fighters (about 185,000).

Programming

Current 'Made for Dave' UKTV Originals

Previous 'Made for Dave' UKTV Originals

Current reruns and imports

Sport
From 2008 to 2010, Dave showed highlights of the World Rally Championship.

On 6 January 2016, UKTV announced that Dave would show its first-ever live sporting event with a boxing match between David Haye and Mark de Mori at the O2 Arena on 16 January 2016 produced by Salter Brothers Entertainment.

In late May 2016, Dave broadcast full live coverage of the 2016 BDO World Trophy darts tournament.

In July 2016, Dave covered cricket's Caribbean Premier League. It broadcast five matches live, including the final and showed the other games in full on a delayed basis.

In 2017, Dave started broadcasting live MMA with promotion BAMMA.

Films

In early 2016, Dave aired western films during the daytime. Dave mostly show films on Friday and Saturday nights, with Friday being a repeat of the film that was shown on a Saturday. In 2019, Dave showed a season of Quentin Tarantino movies. As of 2021, most of the films that are shown on Dave are sourced from the Columbia Pictures archive.

Previous

Dave Weekly podcast
In August 2011, Dave launched a regular comedy podcast called The Dave Weekly hosted on joindave.co.uk and accessible via iTunes. Presented by Ben Shires, the podcast comprises interviews with comedians such as Russell Kane, Jo Brand, Adam Buxton, Paul Foot and Alex Horne along with occasional features.

References

External links

Television channels and stations established in 1998
UKTV
UKTV channels
1998 establishments in the United Kingdom